The 2017 Shanghai Rolex Masters was a tennis tournament played on outdoor hard courts. It was the ninth edition of the Shanghai ATP Masters 1000, classified as an ATP World Tour Masters 1000 event on the 2017 ATP World Tour. It was taking place at Qizhong Forest Sports City Arena in Shanghai, China from October 8 to 15, 2017.

Points and prize money

Point distribution

Prize money

Singles main-draw entrants

Seeds
The following are the seeded players. Seedings are based on ATP rankings as of October 2, 2017. Rankings and points before are as of October 9, 2017.

Other entrants
The following players received wildcards into the singles main draw:
  Denis Shapovalov
  Wu Di
  Wu Yibing
  Zhang Ze

The following players received entry from the qualifying draw:
  Nikoloz Basilashvili
  Jérémy Chardy
  Alexandr Dolgopolov
  Dušan Lajović
  Jordan Thompson
  Frances Tiafoe
  Stefanos Tsitsipas

Withdrawals
Before the tournament
 Tomáš Berdych →replaced by  Damir Džumhur
 Novak Djokovic →replaced by  Steve Johnson
 David Ferrer →replaced by  João Sousa
 Philipp Kohlschreiber →replaced by  Viktor Troicki
 Gaël Monfils →replaced by  Jared Donaldson
 Gilles Müller →replaced by  Jan-Lennard Struff
 Andy Murray →replaced by  Aljaž Bedene
 Kei Nishikori →replaced by  Chung Hyeon
 Milos Raonic →replaced by  Andrey Rublev
 Jo-Wilfried Tsonga →replaced by  Daniil Medvedev
 Stan Wawrinka →replaced by  Ryan Harrison

Retirements
 Aljaž Bedene
 Nick Kyrgios
 Jack Sock
 Mischa Zverev

Doubles main-draw entrants

Seeds

 Rankings are as of October 2, 2017

Other entrants
The following pairs received wildcards into the doubles main draw:
  Gong Maoxin /  Zhang Ze
  Wu Di /  Wu Yibing

Withdrawals
Before the tournament
  Jack Sock

During the tournament
  Nick Kyrgios

Champions

Singles

 Roger Federer def.  Rafael Nadal, 6–4, 6–3

Doubles

 Henri Kontinen /  John Peers def.  Łukasz Kubot /  Marcelo Melo 6–4, 6–2

References

External links
Official Website

 
Shanghai Rolex Masters
Shanghai Masters (tennis)
Shanghai Rolex Masters
Shanghai Rolex Masters